The Frenkel brothers were three Egyptian Jewish brothers – Herschel Frenkel (1902-1972), Shlomo Frenkel (1912-2001), and David Frenkel (1914-1994) – who pioneered animated film in Egypt. Their first successful film, Mafish Fayda (1936), made its protagonist Mish-Mish Effendi the first Arab cartoon star.  After Israel's declaration of independence, the brothers emigrated to France. There they continued to make films, but without the success they had enjoyed in Egypt. They made over thirty films in total.

Egypt
Herschel, Shlomo and Hershel Frenkel were one of six brothers born into a family of Belarusian Jewish origins. Their father Bezalel was a furniture maker with a big commercial success. In 1914, the family moved to Egypt from Jerusalem.

Their first film, Marco Monkey was strongly criticized by Al Ahram in 1936. As a result, they hired collaborators to improve their later work. At the National Festival of Egyptian Cinema in 1936, they showcased eight black-and-white animated shorts, documentaries and advertising spots. Mafish faida (1936), introducing the character Mish Mish Effendi, was a huge success, and stayed in Egyptian cinemas until 1939. The character's success led to demand from the government for use in national propaganda films. National defence, screened in 1940, was in support of efforts to modernize the Egyptian army. Enjoy your food! was another Mish Mish short, set in a circus. The brothers made about a dozen Mishmish Effenfi cartoons. After the war the brothers also started to make commercials: Bravo Osman was a commercial for Vim powder.

France
After moving to Paris in the early 1950s, the brothers tried to make a French version of Mish Mish, Mimiche, who wore a beret instead of a fez. The brothers continued producing a film a year, pairing Mimiche with another character Jenny, who was later combined with a character called Danny. However, they did not find commercial success. They also continued making commercials. In Atomic Experience, a mad scientist throws the world off balance, sending the Eiffel Tower, Arc de Triomphe, the Egyptian Pyramids and the Sphinx all into the air.

Rediscovery
The Egyptian movies of the Frenkel brothers were rediscovered in 1995, and restored for presentation at several film festivals. The brothers were the subject of a 2019 documentary Bukra fil Mish-Mish, directed by Tal Michael.

Films
 Marco Monkey un singe sympa, 1935.
 Mafish Fayda (It's Useless/Nothing To Do), 1936.
 Mish Mish el shater (Mish Mish the Brave), 1939.
 Al difau `al watani (National Defence), 1940
 Bilhana Oushefa (Enjoy your Food /  Bon Appétit), 1946
 Bravo Osman, 1949/1950. Screened at the 19th Torino Film Festival, 2001.
 Simfoniyya ala difaf al Nil, 1949
 Sunlight, 1949
 Abu ras nashfa, 1950
 Al walad al nagib (The prodigal son). Commercial, 1951.
 Une expérience atomique (Atomic Adventure). Commercial, 1954.
 Aventures et fantaisies
 Mon chien, mon âme et moi
 C'est arrivé au zoo
 Le stylo magique
 Le grand triomphe
 Noël parisien
 La Bolte magique
 Le Trésor insaisissable
 Reve du Beau Danube bleu (Dream of the Beautiful Blue Danube), 1964

References

External links
 
 
 

Ashkenazi Jews in Ottoman Palestine
Egyptian animators
Egyptian Ashkenazi Jews
Egyptian emigrants to France
Filmmaking collaborations
French people of Belarusian-Jewish descent
French people of Egyptian-Jewish descent
Sibling trios